Bar-Z Bad Men is a 1937 American Western film directed by Sam Newfield and starring Johnny Mack Brown.

Plot
When reckless and boisterous Jim Waters (Johnny Mack Brown) is faced with a jail term for what he calls harmless fun, he heads to the Bar-Z Ranch, promising to stay out of town. When he gets there, he runs right into the middle of a range war between two cattlemen. Murder and deceit draw Jim in, determined to uncover who’s in back of the rustling.

Cast 
Johnny Mack Brown as Jim Waters
Lois January as Beth Harvey
Tom London as Sig Bostell
Frank LaRue as Hamp Harvey
Ernie Adams as Henchman Pete
Dick Curtis as Brent – Ranch Foreman
Milburn Morante as Sherlock – Arizona Deputy
Jack Rockwell as Ed Parks

External links 

1937 films
1937 Western (genre) films
American Western (genre) films
American black-and-white films
Republic Pictures films
Films with screenplays by George H. Plympton
Films directed by Sam Newfield
1930s English-language films
1930s American films